Cromarty station is a flag stop in Cromarty, Manitoba, Canada.  The station is served by Via Rail's Winnipeg – Churchill train.

Footnotes

External links 
Via Rail Station Information
Government of Manitoba Regional Map

Via Rail stations in Manitoba